The first season of Tawag ng Tanghalan was an amateur singing competition currently aired as a segment of the noontime show It's Showtime from January 2, 2016, to March 11, 2017. Dubbed as "Your all time favorite search for outstanding amateur talents", the competition is open to Filipino contenders from Metro Manila, Luzon, Visayas, and Mindanao.



Hosts and judges
Rey Valera served as the head judge for the first season, with Louie Ocampo, Jaya, Ogie Alcasid, Yeng Constantino serving as fill-in for Valera. Billy Crawford, Karylle, Karla Estrada, K Brosas, Nyoy Volante, Mitoy Yonting, Rico J. Puno, Bobot Mortiz, Erik Santos, and Kyla served as judges for the first season.

However, Louie Ocampo, Kyla, and Erik Santos were not judges until the start of Quarter 3 on June 11, 2016, with Jaya joining in July 2016 and Ogie Alcasid at the start of Quarter 4. Bobot Mortiz left his judging duties at the early part of the season.

Anne Curtis, Amy Perez-Castillo, Mariel Rodriguez-Padilla, and Vice Ganda served as hosts for the first season with Kim Atienza, Ryan Bang, Jhong Hilario, Teddy Corpuz, and Jugs Jugueta serving as co-hosts. Vhong Navarro later on replaced Padilla who filed a maternity leave.

Kim Chiu, Alex Gonzaga and Robi Domingo served as guest hosts in the absence of the main hosts.

Prizes 
The winner as the Grand Champion of Tawag ng Tanghalan will receive musical instrument package from JB Music, family vacation trip, recording contract from Star Music, negosyo package, a house and lot from Camella, and a trophy, plus  cash. The 2nd and 3rd place will receive ₱500,000 and ₱250,000 cash respectively. Those who are able to advance to the Top 6 but were not able to advance to the Top 3 were given a consolation prize of ₱100,000 cash.

Semifinal Results
Color Key:

Quarter 1 
The first quarter of the contest covered the months from January to March. The week-long showdown took place on March 28 – April 2, 2016.

Round 1 (March 28, 2016) 

 Theme: Audition Song

Round 2 (March 29, 2016) 

 Theme: Awit sa Pamilya (Song for the Family)

Round 3 (March 30, 2016) 

 Theme: Musical Influence

Round 4 (March 31, 2016) 

 Theme: Greatest Love

Round 5 (April 1, 2016) 

  Theme: Hurado's Song Choice (Judges' Choice)

Round 6 (April 2, 2016) 

 Theme: Semifinal Song

Final Results 

Maricel Callo (Mindanao) and Mary Gidget Dela Llana (Luzon) were the first two grand finalists.

Quarter II
The second quarter of the contest covered the months of April and May. The week-long showdown took place on June 6–11, 2016.

Round 1 (June 6, 2016) 

 Theme: Audition Song

Round 2 (June 7, 2016) 

 Theme: Fight Song

Round 3 (June 8, 2016) 

 Theme: Awit sa Pamilya (Song for the Family)

Round 4 (June 9, 2016) 

 Theme: Musical Influence

Round 5 (June 10, 2016) 

  Theme: Hurado's Song Choice (Judges' Choice)

Round 6 (June 11, 2016) 

 Theme: Semifinal Song

Final Results 

Pauline Agupitan (Luzon) and Marielle Montellano (Visayas) were announced as the 3rd and 4th grand finalists.

Quarter III
The third quarter of the contest covered the months from June to September. The week-long showdown took place on October 3–8, 2016.

Round 1 (October 3, 2016) 

 Theme: Audition Song

Round 2 (October 4, 2016) 

 Theme: Fight Song

Round 3 (October 5, 2016) 

 Theme: Awit sa Pamilya (Song for the Family)

Round 4 (October 6, 2016) 

 Theme: Musical Influence

Round 5 (October 7, 2016) 

 Theme: Hurado's Song Choice (Judges' Choice)

Round 6 (October 8, 2016) 

 Theme: Semifinal Song

Final Results 

Eumee Capile (Luzon) and Noven Belleza (Visayas) were announced as the 5th and 6th grand finalists.

Notes

Quarter IV
The fourth quarter of the contest covered the months from originally October to December 2016, but was extended until February 2017. The week-long showdown was originally scheduled for December 2016, but was postponed to February 20–25, 2017.

Round 1 (February 20, 2017) 

 Theme: Audition Song

Round 2 (February 21, 2017) 

 Theme: Fight Song

Round 3 (February 22, 2017) 

 Theme: Awit sa Pamilya (Song for the Family)

Round 4 (February 23, 2017) 

 Theme: Musical Influence

Round 5 (February 24, 2017) 

 Theme: Hurado's Song Choice (Judges' Choice)

Round 6 (February 25, 2017) 

 Theme: Semifinal Song

Final Results 

Carlmalone Montecido (Visayas) and Sam Mangubat (Luzon) were announced as the 7th and 8th grand finalists.

Notes

Ultimate Resbak
All Semi-finalists who lost were now Ultimate Resbakers. They competed again and had another chance to qualify for the Grand Finals which is "Ang Huling Tapatan". The week-long showdown took place on February 27 – March 4, 2017.

Color Key:

Round 1 (February 27 to March 2)

Day 1 (February 27)

Day 2 (February 28)

Day 3 (March 1)

Day 4 (March 2)

Round 2 (March 3/4) 

Rachel Gabreza (Metro Manila) and Froilan Canlas (Luzon) were announced as the 9th and 10th grand finalists.

Ang Huling Tapatan (Grand Finals)
The week-long showdown for the Grand Finals took place on March 6–11, 2017 held at the Newport Performing Arts Theater, Resorts World Manila.

Summary of Grand Finalists 
Color Key:

Results Details

Daily Rounds 
Color Key:

Round 1 (March 6–7, 2017)

 Judges:
 Monday: Rey Valera (head judge), Erik Santos, Karylle, Yeng Constantino, and Karla Estrada
 Tuesday: Rey Valera (head judge), Kyla, Karylle, Yeng Constantino, and Karla Estrada
 Hosts:
 Monday: Vhong Navarro, Anne Curtis, Vice Ganda
 Tuesday: Vhong Navarro, Anne Curtis, Vice Ganda, Amy Perez-Castillo
 Gong:
 Monday and Tuesday: Jhong Hilario

Round 2 (March 8–9, 2017) 

 Judges:
 Wednesday: Rey Valera (head judge), Billy Crawford, Mitoy Yonting, Yeng Constantino, and Karla Estrada
 Thursday:
 Hosts:
 Wednesday and Thursday: Vhong Navarro, Anne Curtis, Vice Ganda, Amy Perez-Castillo
 Gong:
 Wednesday and Thursday: Jhong Hilario

Round 3 (March 10, 2017)

 Judges: Rey Valera (head judge), Billy Crawford, Nyoy Volante, Yeng Constantino, and Karla Estrada
 Hosts: Vhong Navarro, Anne Curtis, Amy Perez-Castillo
 Gong: Jhong Hilario

For this round, only one will advanced for the Live Finale. Since Pauline Agupitan and Marielle Montellano tied for the final slot, head judge Rey Valera decided that both will advance and will not break the tie.

Live Finale (March 11, 2017)

 Judges:
 Hosts: Vhong Navarro, Anne Curtis, Vice Ganda, Amy Perez-Castillo
 Gong: Jhong Hilario

Part 1

Part 2: Medley Songs 

Noven Belleza from Visayas emerged as the Grand Champion, followed by Sam Mangubat as the 2nd placer and Froilan Canlas as the 3rd placer.

Elimination table 
Color Key:

Results Details:

By Quarter

By Region

References

External links
 Tawag ng Tanghalan (season 1)

Tawag ng Tanghalan seasons
2016 Philippine television seasons
2017 Philippine television seasons